Heinkel Flugzeugwerke was a German aircraft manufacturing company that was founded by and named after Ernst Heinkel. It is notable for having produced bomber aircraft for the Luftwaffe in World War II and for important contributions to high-speed flight, with the pioneering examples of a successful liquid-fueled rocket and a turbojet-powered aircraft in aviation history, with both Heinkel designs' first flights occurring shortly before the outbreak of World War II in Europe.

History
Following the successful career of Ernst Heinkel as the chief designer for the Hansa-Brandenburg aviation firm in World War I,  Heinkel's own firm was established at Warnemünde in 1922, after the restrictions on German aviation imposed by the Treaty of Versailles were relaxed. The company's first post-World War I aircraft design success was the design of the all-metal, single-engined  Heinkel He 70 Blitz high-speed mail plane and airliner for Deutsche Luft Hansa in 1932, which broke a number of air speed records for its class. It was followed by the two-engine Heinkel He 111 Doppel-Blitz, which became a mainstay of the Luftwaffe during World War II as a bomber. Heinkel's most important designers at this point were the twin Günter brothers, Siegfried and Walter, and Heinrich Hertel. The firm's headquarters was in Rostock later known as Heinkel-Nord (Heinkel-North), located in what used to be named the Rostock-Marienehe neighborhood (today's Rostock-Schmarl community, along the west bank of the Unterwarnow estuary), where the firm additionally possessed a factory airfield along the coastline in the Rostock/Schmarl neighborhood roughly three kilometers (1.9 miles) north-northwest of the main offices, with a second Heinkel-Süd engineering and manufacturing facility in Schwechat, Austria, after the Anschluss in 1938.

World War II

The Heinkel company is most closely associated with aircraft used by the Luftwaffe during World War II. This began with the adaptation of the He 70 and, in particular, the He 111, to be used as bombers. Heinkel also provided the Luftwaffe's only operational heavy bomber, the Heinkel He 177, although this was never deployed in significant numbers. The German Luftwaffe equipped both of these bombers with the Z-Gerät, Y-Gerät, and Knickebein, developed by Johannes Plendl, and thus they were among the first aircraft to feature advanced night navigation devices, common in all commercial airplanes today.

Heinkel was less successful in selling fighter designs. Before the war, the Heinkel He 112 had been rejected in favour of the Messerschmitt Bf 109, and Heinkel's attempt to top Messerschmitt's design with the Heinkel He 100 failed due to political interference within the Reichsluftfahrtministerium (RLM — Reich Aviation Ministry). The company also provided the Luftwaffe with an outstanding night fighter, the Heinkel He 219, which also suffered from politics and was produced only in limited numbers, but was the first Luftwaffe front-line aircraft to use retractable tricycle gear for its undercarriage design, and the world's first front-line military aircraft to use ejection seats. By contrast, the only heavy bomber to enter service with the Luftwaffe during the war years – the Heinkel He 177 Greif – turned out to be one of the most troublesome German wartime aircraft designs, plagued with numerous engine fires from both its inadequate engine accommodation design and its general airframe design being mis-tasked, for a 30-meter (100 ft) class wingspan design, to be built to be able to perform moderate-angle dive bombing attacks from the moment of its approval by the RLM in early November 1937, which would not be rescinded until September 1942.

From 1941 until the end of the war, the company was merged with engine manufacturer Hirth to form Heinkel-Hirth, giving the company the capability of manufacturing its own powerplants, including its Heinkel Strahltriebwerke turbojet engine manufacturing firm.

The Heinkel name was also behind pioneering work in jet engine and rocket development, and also the German aviation firm that attempted to popularize the use of retractable tricycle landing gear, a relative rarity in early WW II German airframe design. In 1939, flown by Erich Warsitz, the Heinkel He 176 and Heinkel He 178 became the first aircraft designs to fly under liquid-fuel rocket and turbojet power respectively.

Heinkel was the first to develop a jet fighter to prototype stage, the Heinkel He 280, the first Heinkel design to use and fly with retractable tricycle gear. In early 1942, the photographic interpretation unit at RAF Medmenham first saw evidence of the existence of the 280 in aerial reconnaissance photographs taken after a bombing raid on the Rostock factory. Thereafter, the Allies began intensive aerial reconnaissance intended to learn more about the German jet aircraft programme.

The He 219 night fighter design was the first German frontline combat aircraft to have retracting tricycle gear, and the first operational military aircraft anywhere to use ejection seats. Heinkel's He 280, the firm's only twin-jet aircraft design to fly never reached production, however, since the RLM wanted Heinkel to concentrate on bomber production and instead promoted the development of the rival Messerschmitt Me 262. Very late in the war, a Heinkel single-jet powered fighter finally took to the air as the Heinkel He 162A Spatz (sparrow) as the first military jet to use retractable tricycle landing gear, use a turbojet engine from its maiden flight forward, and use an ejection seat from the start, but it had barely entered service at the time of Germany's surrender.

Slave labour during World War II
Heinkel was a major user of Sachsenhausen concentration camp labour, using between 6,000 and 8,000 prisoners on the He 177 bomber.

Post-war

Following the war, Heinkel was prohibited from manufacturing aircraft and instead built bicycles, motor scooters (see below), and the Heinkel microcar. The company eventually returned to aircraft in the mid-1950s, licence building F-104 Starfighters for the West German Luftwaffe. In 1965, the company was absorbed by Vereinigte Flugtechnische Werke (VFW), which was in turn absorbed by Messerschmitt-Bölkow-Blohm in 1980 and later became part of Airbus.

The company designed a VSTOL aircraft called the Heinkel He 231 (VJ 101A), intended to protect West Germany's airfields against Soviet attack.

Products

Aircraft

HD - Heinkel Doppeldecker
Heinkel HD 14
Heinkel HD 15 
Heinkel HD 16
Heinkel HD 17
Heinkel HD 19
Heinkel HD 20
Heinkel HD 21
Heinkel HD 22
Heinkel HD 23
Heinkel HD 24 seaplane trainer (1926)
Heinkel HD 25
Heinkel HD 26
Heinkel HD 27 
Heinkel HD 28
Heinkel HD 29
Heinkel HD 30
Heinkel HD 32
Heinkel HD 33
Heinkel HD 34
Heinkel HD 35
Heinkel HD 36
Heinkel HD 37 fighter (biplane)
Heinkel HD 38 fighter (biplane)
Heinkel HD 39
Heinkel HD 40
Heinkel HD 41
Heinkel HD 42 seaplane trainer
Heinkel HD 43 fighter (biplane)
Heinkel HD 44
Heinkel HD 45
Heinkel HD 46
Heinkel HD 49
Heinkel HD 50
Heinkel HD 55 reconnaissance flying boat
Heinkel HD 56
Heinkel HD 59
Heinkel HD 60
Heinkel HD 61
Heinkel HD 62
Heinkel HD 63
Heinkel HD 66

HE - Heinkel Eindecker
Heinkel HE 1 low-wing floatplane (monoplane)
Heinkel HE 2 improvement on the HE 1
Heinkel HE 3
Heinkel HE 4 reconnaissance (monoplane)
Heinkel HE 5 reconnaissance (monoplane)
Heinkel HE 8 reconnaissance (monoplane)
Heinkel HE 9
Heinkel HE 12
Heinkel HE 18

He - Heinkel (RLM designator)
 Heinkel He 45 bomber + trainer
 Heinkel He 46 reconnaissance
 Heinkel He 49 fighter (biplane)
 Heinkel He 50 reconnaissance + dive bomber (biplane)
 Heinkel He 51 fighter + close-support (biplane)
 Heinkel He 57 Heron
 Heinkel He 58
 Heinkel He 59 reconnaissance (biplane seaplane)
 Heinkel He 60 ship-borne reconnaissance (biplane seaplane)
 Heinkel He 62 reconnaissance seaplane
 Heinkel He 63 trainer biplane
 Heinkel He 64 sports plane
 Heinkel He 70 "Blitz" (Lightning), single-engine transport + mailplane, 1932
 Heinkel He 71 single-seat monoplane
 Heinkel He 72 Kadett (Cadet), trainer
 Heinkel He 74 fighter + advanced trainer (prototype)
 Heinkel He 100 fighter
 Heinkel He 111 bomber
 Heinkel He 112 fighter
 Heinkel He 113 (fictitious alternative designation for He 100D-1)
 Heinkel He 114 reconnaissance seaplane
 Heinkel He 115 general-purpose seaplane
 Heinkel He 116 transport + reconnaissance
 Heinkel He 118
 Heinkel He 119 single-engine high-speed bomber (prototypes), reconnaissance aircraft, 1937
 Heinkel He 120  four-engine long-range passenger flying-boat (project), 1938
 Heinkel He 162 Spatz (sparrow), Volksjäger (People's Fighter) design competition choice, fighter (jet-engined)
 Heinkel He 170
 Heinkel He 172 trainer (prototype)
 Heinkel He 176 pioneering liquid-fueled rocket-powered experimental aircraft (prototype)
 Heinkel He 177 Greif (Griffon), the Third Reich's only long-range heavy bomber
 Heinkel He 178 world's first jet-engined aircraft
 Heinkel He 219 Uhu (Eagle-Owl), night-fighter
 Heinkel He 220  four-engine long-range passenger flying-boat (project), 1939
 Heinkel He 270
 Heinkel He 274 high-altitude bomber, He 177 development, two prototypes completed post-war in France
 Heinkel He 275 four-engine bomber; project only
 Heinkel He 277 heavy bomber, paper-only Amerika Bomber He 177 development (by February 1943) with four BMW 801E radial engines, never built
 Heinkel He 278 four-engine turboprop bomber; project only
 Heinkel He 280 fighter (jet-engined)
 Heinkel He 343 four-engined bomber (jet-engined project), 1944
 Heinkel He 519, high-speed bomber (He 119 derivative; project only), 1944
 Heinkel Type 98 Medium Bomber - He 111 for service with the IJNAS
 Heinkel A7He He 112 development for the IJAAS
 Heinkel Navy Type He Interceptor Fighter He 100 development for the IJNAS
P - Projekt
 Heinkel P.1054
 Heinkel P.1062
 Heinkel P.1063
 Heinkel P.1064
 Heinkel P.1065
 Heinkel P.1066
 Heinkel P.1069
 Heinkel P.1070
 Heinkel P.1071
 Heinkel P.1072
 Heinkel P.1074
 Heinkel P.1075
 Heinkel He P.1076, A nearly conventional 1944 design, with slightly forward swept wings and contra-rotating propellers at the front.
 Heinkel P.1077 Julia rocket-propulsion point-defense interceptor
 Heinkel P.1078
 Heinkel He P.1078A, fighter (jet-engined) (project)
 Heinkel He P.1078B, tailless fighter (jet-engined) (project)
 Heinkel He P.1078C, tailless fighter (jet-engined) (project), 1944
 Heinkel He P.1079A, two-engine night-fighter (jet-engined) (project)
 Heinkel He P.1079B/I, all-weather heavy fighter (flying wing design) (jet-engined)
 Heinkel He P.1079B/II, all-weather heavy fighter (flying wing design) (jet-engined), 1945
 Heinkel Lerche
 Heinkel Wespe

Microcar

Heinkel introduced the "Kabine" bubble car in 1956. It competed with the BMW Isetta and the Messerschmitt KR200. It had a unit body and a four-stroke single-cylinder engine.

Heinkel stopped manufacturing the Kabine in 1958 but production continued under licence, first by Dundalk Engineering Company in Ireland and then by Trojan Cars Ltd., which ceased production in 1966.

Scooters

Heinkel introduced the "Tourist" motor scooter in the 1950s which was known for its reliability. A large and relatively heavy touring machine, it provided good weather protection with a full fairing and the front wheel turning under a fixed nose extension.

Heinkel also made a lighter  scooter called the Heinkel 150.

Mopeds

Heinkel built the Perle moped from 1954 to 1957. The Perle was a sophisticated cycle with a cast alloy unit frame, rear suspension, a fully enclosed chain with part of the chain enclosure integral with the swingarm, and interchangeable wheels. This high level of sophistication came at a high cost. As with most mopeds, it had a two-stroke engine with a displacement of 50cc that operated on a mixture of gasoline and lubrication oil.  Approximately twenty-seven thousand Perles were sold.

See also
List of RLM aircraft designations
Maicoletta
Zündapp Bella
Jägerstab (Fighter Staff)
Rüstungsstab (Armament Staff)

References

External links

Heinkel Motor Scooters
Heinkel Scale Models
The official Erich Warsitz Website (world's first jet pilot), inclusive rare videos and audio commentaries
 

 
Defunct aircraft manufacturers of Germany
Scooter manufacturers
Companies involved in the Holocaust